DYWF (93.1 FM), broadcasting as 93.1 Brigada News FM, is a radio station owned by Vimcontu Broadcasting Corporation and operated by Brigada Mass Media Corporation. It serves as the Visayas flagship station of Brigada News FM. The station's studio is located at the 2nd Floor, JSU-PSU Mariners' Court-Cebu, ALU-VIMCONTU Welfare Center, Legazpi Ext., Pier 1, Brgy. San Roque, Cebu City, and its transmitter is located at Mt. Busay, Brgy. Babag 1, Cebu City (near ABS-CBN tower). It operates 24 hours a day.

History
 The station was inaugurated by Vimcontu Broadcasting Corporation on May 1, 1976, under the call letters DYLA-FM.
 In 1992, it changed its call letters to DYWF and rebranded as Smash FM 93.1, aired a Modern Rock format.
 In September 1997, Mareco Broadcasting Network acquired the station's airtime lease and relaunched it as 93.1 Crossover with a Smooth AC format. At the time MBN took operations, Crossover went on the air on 93.1 FM.
 In 2003, Vimcontu Broadcasting Corporation took full control of the station and renamed the station back to Smash FM 93.1 with the same format. Meanwhile, Crossover moved to the then-newly acquired 90.7 FM, which was formerly owned by UBSI.
 On September 1, 2009, Smash FM 93.1 was officially rebranded as Club Radio 93.1, becoming the city's first and only FM radio station playing an all-dance format.
 In February 2013, the station rebranded back to Smash FM and switched to a mass-based format.
 On July 27, 2013, Brigada Mass Media Corporation, owner of Brigada Newspaper & its flagship station in General Santos, took over the station's operations and relaunched the station as 93.1 Brigada News FM under the helm of former RMN Cebu and DYKC radio announcer, station manager of the station, current Area Manager for Visayas and founder of ANAKK Inc., Raul del Prado. It was formally launched on October 1, 2013.
 In August 2022, the station transferred its transmitter site from Winland Tower Condominium along Juana Osmeña Ext. to Mt. Busay for better reception.

Ratings
Brigada News FM Cebu remains as the dominant undisputed over-all number one FM radio station in Cebu based on the recent surveys conducted by KBP-Kantar and Nielsen, and it continues to sustain its momentum as the dominant overall radio station, in terms of listenership in Cebu City, beating other FM stations of various formats in the market.

References

Radio stations in Metro Cebu
News and talk radio stations in the Philippines
Radio stations established in 1976